This is a list of gliders/sailplanes of the world, (this reference lists all gliders with references, where available) 
Note: Any aircraft can glide for a short time, but gliders are designed to glide for longer.

Netherlands miscellaneous constructors 
 KANJA Ultra Light Glider
 Nijs & Van Driel T.10
 Akerboom & Schmidt T-10 - J. Akerboom & J. Schmidt
 Akerboom & Schmidt T-10 III - J. Akerboom & J. Schmidt
 Akerboom & Schmidt T-20 - J. Akerboom & J. Schmidt
 Platz Zeilvliegtuig – Platz, Reinhold – Netherlands
 Snellen V-20 – Snellen, Roeland J. – NV Vliegtuigbouw Deventer
 Hoekstra T-20 - J.K. Hoekstra
 Alsema Sagitta - Piet Alsema – NV Vliegtuigbouw Teuge

Notes

Further reading

External links

Lists of glider aircraft